Roshkodom is a sweet popular in West Bengal and other East Indian states and Bangladesh.

It consists of a small ball of Rasgulla (another type of Indian dessert, which is harder than the normal ones in this recipe) covered in a layer of khoya/mava (solidified dried milk) which is further covered on the outer surface by poppy seeds. .

References

Jharkhandi cuisine
Bangladeshi desserts
Bengali desserts